U Sports women's ice hockey is the highest level of play of women's ice hockey at the university level under the auspices of U Sports, Canada's governing body for university sports. Women's ice hockey has been played in U Sports since the 1997-98 season, when the governing body was known as the Canadian Interuniversity Athletics Union, following a long stint of teams only competing in the OUA. There are 35 teams, all of which are based in Canada, that are divided into four conferences that are eligible to compete for the year-end championship. As these players compete at the university level, they are obligated to follow the rule of standard eligibility of five years. This competition is considered as the second level in the pyramid of Canadian women's hockey, below the Canadian Women's Hockey League (CWHL).

History 

The 1890s marked the beginning of the first women's ice hockey teams in Canadian universities. These universities included the University of Toronto in Toronto, Queen's University in Kingston, and McGill University in Montreal. In 1908, other schools such as the Calgary Collegiate Institute and Mount Royal University began to ice competitive teams as well. In the early years, teams played behind closed doors and men were not authorized to attend the matches. The referee was the only man present during the matches.
Starting in 1900, male spectators were authorized to assist in women's matches in most of the Canadian provinces and some university teams. During this time, there was no university women's league and some university women's teams competed against rivals representing cities. Sometimes, they were forced to cross big geographical distances by train in order to participate in tournaments

The first provincial women's championship took place in 1914 in Picton, Ontario. Six teams participated in the event, including the University of Toronto. In 1921, the University of Toronto bested McGill University during the first Canadian women's university championship. The Toronto Lady Blues would gain 11 championship titles, compared with two titles for the Queen's Golden Gaels before the women's university league dissolved in 1933 During this time period, Elizabeth Graham, a Queen's University goaltender, carried a fencing mask during matches in 1927. She would be the first goaltender in ice hockey, before the famous Jacques Plante, to carry a protective face mask.

On December 16, 1922, the Ladies Ontario Hockey Association (LOHA) was formed, and included several Ontario university teams In 1923, the Women's Intercollegiate Athletic Union (WIAU) is created with the aim of offering sporting events to students in Ontario. The WIAU coordinated the programs of the students, and several university women's teams were members there. In the autumn of 1923, the Canadian Amateur Hockey Association held its annual meeting in Port Arthur, Ontario. It was here that the association decided not to give to the women official recognition as hockey players. From 1931 until 1941, the non-university team Preston Rivulettes were unbeaten in the LOHA and won ten consecutive championships. Numerous university women's teams are reluctant to join the LOHA because they estimated that they would be unable to compete against the Rivulettes. Due to the Great Depression, several university women's teams were dissolved. Consequently, ice hockey teams became rarer for numerous women's teams.

In 1941, the LOHA was dissolved and, in the aftermath, several teams begin to disappear. The Second World War also affected the level of participation in women's ice hockey in Canada. From 1936 to 1948, and from 1951 to 1960, there was no WIAU official women's competition. Women’s ice hockey would not return until the 1960s at the Canadian university level.

The revival in the 1960s resulted in the creation of new women's teams in several Canadian universities. In 1969, the Canada West Universities Athletic Association, with a mission to organize championships in multiple sports for women university students in Western Canada, presented a proposal which eventually led to the creation of the Canadian Women's Intercollegiate Athletic Union (CWIAU). The first recognized national women's championship was in volleyball, presented in March, 1970 at the University of Waterloo. While the CWIAU had been created, university women's ice hockey was still not prevalent outside Ontario, where the Women's Intercollegiate Athletic Union (WIAU) merged with the Ontario-Quebec University Athletic Association (OQUAA) to form the Ontario Women's Interuniversity Athletic Association (OWIAA) in 1971. This resulted in university women's teams multiplying and several American university tournaments inviting Canadian teams. Regional women's university ice hockey championships began to grow elsewhere in Canada, and in March 1998, the first Canadian national university championship in women’s ice hockey took place. The Concordia Stingers, in Montreal, hosted the event and won the first U Sports championship.

Schedule structure 
In the U Sports regular season, 36 teams play between 20 and 28 matches in their respective regional conferences. At the end of the season, qualifying rounds (in each regional conference) determine the champion team in each of the four Canadian regions. Afterwards, a national tournament takes place consisting of eight teams: the winning team in each of the four regional championship conferences; (Atlantic University Sport, Quebec Student Sports Federation (in French, Réseau du sport étudiant du Québec), Ontario University Athletics and Canada West Universities Athletic Association). In addition, the organizing team of the national tournament (the university which hosts the annual event) and the defending champion, as well as the finalist from all four conferences qualify.

Participating universities 
For the 2019–20 season, the Canadian university women's ice hockey competition consisted of four conferences and 34 teams. The Lethbridge Pronghorns dropped their program following the 2019-20 season. The Bishop's Gaiters program joined the RSEQ conference in 2020–21 while the Trinity Western Spartans and MacEwan Griffins programs became members of the Canada West conference that same year. However, following the cancellation of the 2020–21 season, the Laurentian Voyageurs discontinued their women's ice hockey program in 2021 leaving U Sports with 35 women's ice hockey teams.

Atlantic University Sport

Canada West Universities Athletic Association

Ontario University Athletics

Ligue de Hockey Universitaire Féminin

National Champions 

The U Sports women's ice hockey championship is awarded annually to Canada's women's ice hockey champions at the university level. The championship has been competed for since 1998, when the sport was established in the league. Previously, the most important Canadian university women's ice hockey championship was the one from the Women's Intercollegiate Athletic Union (WIAU) (from 1921 till 1971), along with that of the Ontario Women's Interuniversity Athletic Association (OWIAA) (from 1972 till 1997) which awarded the Dr. Judy McCaw trophy to the team champion.

The governing body was known as the Canadian Interuniversity Athletics Union (CIAU) when women's hockey was added to its championship roster. The body's name changed to Canadian Interuniversity Sport (CIS) in 2001 and the current U Sports in 2016.

Awards and honours

U Sports championship MVP 

1997-98 Corinne Swirsky, Concordia Stingers
1998-99 Lori Shupak, Alberta Pandas
1999-00 Kim St-Pierre, McGill Martlets
2000-01 Jen Rawson, Toronto Lady Blues
2001-02 Danielle Bourgeois, Alberta Pandas
2002-03 Lori Shupak, Alberta Pandas
2003-04 Danielle Bourgeois, Alberta Pandas
2004-05 Ashley Stephenson, Wilfrid Laurier Golden Hawks
2005-06 Tarin Podloski, Alberta Pandas
2006-07 Lindsay McAlpine, Alberta Pandas
2007-08 Cathy Chartrand,  McGill Martlets
2008-09 Catherine Ward,  McGill Martlets
2009-10 Stephanie Ramsay, Alberta Pandas
2010-11 Jordanna Peroff, McGill Martlets
2011-12 Amanda Tapp, Calgary Dinos
2014-15 Kelly Campbell, Western Mustangs
2015-16 Marie-Pier Chabot, Montreal Carabins
2016-17 Lindsey Post, Alberta Pandas
2017-18 Lauryn Keen, Manitoba Bisons
2018-19 Jade Downie-Landry, McGill Martlets
2019-20 None (Tournament cancelled due to the COVID-19 pandemic)
2020-21 None (Tournament cancelled due to the COVID-19 pandemic)

Player of the year (Brodrick Trophy) 

1997-98 Corinne Swirsky, Concordia Stingers
1998-99 Corinne Swirsky,  Concordia Stingers
1999-2000 Corinne Swirsky, Concordia Stingers
2000-01 Brandy West, Regina Cougars
2001-02 Lori Shupak, Alberta Pandas
2002-03 Kim St-Pierre, McGill Martlets
2003-04 Danielle Bourgeois, Alberta Pandas
2004-05 Danielle Bourgeois, Alberta Pandas
2005-06 Kate Allgood,  Brock Badgers
2006-07 Lindsay McAlpine, Alberta Pandas
2007-08 Brayden Ferguson, St. Francis Xavier X-Women
2008-09 Tarin Podloski, Alberta Pandas
2009-10 Liz Knox, Wilfrid Laurier Golden Hawks
2010-11 Hayley Wickenheiser, Calgary Dinos
2011-12 Ann-Sophie Bettez, McGill Martlets
2012-13 Melodie Daoust, McGill Martlets
2013-14 Katia Clement-Hydra, McGill Martlets
2014-15 Iya Gavrilova, Calgary Dinos
2015-16 Valerie Lamenta, Guelph Gryphons
2016-17 Sarah Bujould, St. Francis Xavier X-Women
2017-18 Daley Oddy, St. Francis Xavier X-Women
2018-19 Alex Poznikoff, Alberta Pandas
2019-20 Tyra Meropoulis, St. Francis Xavier X-Women
2020-21 None (Season cancelled due to the COVID-19 pandemic)
2021-22 Jade Downie-Landry, McGill Martlets

Rookie of the year 
1999-00 Danielle Bourgeois, Alberta Pandas
2000-01 Erin Tady,  Regina Cougars
2001-02 Cindy Eadie, Wilfrid Laurier Golden Hawks
2002-03 Lindsay Taylor, Saint Mary's Huskies
2003-04 Cecilia Anderson, Concordia Stingers
2004-05 Courtney Schriver, Saint Mary's Huskies
2005-06 Karissa Swan, Regina Cougars
2006-07 Catherine Ward, McGill Martlets
2007-08 Ann-Sophie Bettez,  McGill Martlets
2008-09 Marie-Andrée Leclerc-Auger, McGill Martlets
2009-10 Caitlin MacDonald, Manitoba Bisons
2010-11 Alex Normore, St. Francis Xavier X-Women
2011-12 Mélodie Daoust, McGill Martlets
2012-13 Christine Grant, Guelph Gryphons
2013-14 Kaitlin Willoughby, Saskatchewan Huskies
2014-15 Alanna Sharman, Manitoba Bisons
2015-16 Mélodie Bouchard, Ottawa Gee-Gees
2016-17 Tricia Deguire, McGill Martlets
2017-18 Maria Dominico, Nipissing Lakers
2018-19 Erika Crouse, Ryerson Rams
2019-20 Madison Willan, Alberta Pandas
2020-21 None (Season cancelled due to the COVID-19 pandemic)
2021-22 Abby Lewis, St. Francis Xavier X-Women

Outstanding student-athlete 
Marion Hillard Award
The award honours Marion Hillard, a top player on the University of Toronto Varsity Blues outstanding hockey team which captured six championships from 1922-27. Hillard was President of the University Hockey Club and was a member of the women's Athletic Directorate for four years. The award recognizes excellence in a student-athlete in three areas: hockey, academics and community involvement.

1997-98 Karen Kendall, Concordia Stingers
1998-99 Bridget Bates, Toronto Lady Blues
1999-00 Karina Verdon, Ottawa Gee-Gees
2000-01 Virginie Bilodeau, Patriotes de UQTR
2001-02 Lauren Houghton,  Concordia Stingers
2002-03 Jenny McRae, Toronto Lady Blues
2003-04 Janna Gillis, Concordia Stingers
2004-05 Sue McCutcheon, Toronto Lady blues
2005-06 Leah Kutcher, Dalhousie Tigers
2006-07 Taryn Barry, Alberta Pandas
2007-08 Shauna Denis, McGill Martlets
2008-09 Danika Smith, Ottawa Gee-Gees
2009-10 Kaitlyn McNutt, Dalhousie Tigers
2010-11 Andrea Switalski, Mount Allison Mounties
2011-12 Jill Morillo, UOIT Ridgebacks
2012-13 Kayla Blackmore, St. Thomas Tommies
2013-14 Nicole Kesteris, Toronto Varsity Blues
2014-15 Nicole Kesteris, Toronto Varsity Blues
2015-16 Janelle Froehler, Alberta Pandas
2016-17 Sarah Weninger, Mount Royal Cougars
2017-18 Ailish Forfar, Ryerson Rams
2018-19 Jenna Gray, York Lions
2019-20 Emilia Cotter, McGill Martlets
2020-21 None (Season cancelled due to the COVID-19 pandemic)
2021-22 Jana Headrick, UNB Reds

Coach of the year 
1999-00 Les Lawton, Concordia Stingers
2000-01 Karen Hughes,Toronto Lady Blues
2001-02 Howie Draper, Alberta Pandas
2002-03 Peter Smith, McGill Martlets and Lisa MacDonald, Saint Mary's Huskies
2003-04 Howie Draper, Alberta Pandas
2004-05 Todd Erskine, Brock Badgers
2005-06 Lesley Jordan, Dalhousie Tigers
2006-07 Rhéal Bordage, Moncton Aigles Bleus
2007-08 Peter Smith, McGill Martlets
2008-09 Howie Draper, Alberta Pandas
2009-10 Steve Kook, Saskatchewan Huskies
2010-11 Jim Denham, Brock Badgers
2011-12 Peter Smith, McGill Martlets
2012-13 Graham Thomas, UBC Thunderbirds
2013-14 Steve Kook, Saskatchewan Huskies
2014-15 Chris Higgins and Dave Barrett, Western Mustangs
2015-16 Chris Larade, Saint Mary’s Huskies
2016-17 Chris Larade, Saint Mary’s Huskies
2017-18 Jon Rempel, Manitoba Bisons
2018-19 Howie Draper, Alberta Pandas
2019-20 Vicky Sunohara, Toronto Varsity Blues
2020-21 None (Season cancelled due to the COVID-19 pandemic)
2021-22 Vicky Sunohara, Toronto Varsity Blues

Reference

All Star Teams

1998-99 
G: Lesley Jordan, Saint Mary's Huskies
G: Shelly Campbell, Windsor Lancers de
D: Alana Mullins, Acadia Axewomen
D: Delaney Collins, Concordia Stingers
D: Ali MacMillan, Toronto Varsity Blues
D: Colleen Sostorics, Calgary Dinos
F: Corinne Swirsky, Concordia Stringers
F: Kelly Bechard, Calgary Dinos
F: Tasha Noble, Saint Mary's Huskies
F :  Coley Dosser,  Guelph Gryphons
F:  Anne Rodrigue, Concordia Stingers
F:  Sue Ann Van Damme, Toronto Varsity Blues

Reference

1999-2000 

G: Kim St-Pierre, McGill Martlets
G: Robyn Rittmaster, Calgary Dinos
D: Genevieve Fagnan, Concordia Stingers
D: Sandra Hustler, Windsor Lancers
D: Leanne MacDonald, St. Francis Xavier X-Women
D: Colleen Sostorics, Calgary Dinos
F: Lisa Backman, Wilfrid Laurier Golden Hawks
F: Urszula May, Toronto Varsity Blues
F: Lori Shupak, Alberta Pandas
F: Caroline Proulx, Patriotes de UQTR
F: Corinne Swirsky, Concordia Stingers
F: Brandy West,  Regina Cougars

Playoffs All Stars
CIS championship MVP player: Lori Shupak, Alberta Pandas
G: Keely Brown, Toronto Varsity Blues
D: Geneviève Fagnan, Concordia Stingers
D: Leanne MacDonald, St. Francis Xavier X-Women
F: Julie Hornsby,  McGill Martlets
F: Anne Rodrigue, Concordia Stingers
F: Krysty Lorenz, Alberta Pandas

Reference

2000-01 
G: Kim St-Pierre,  McGill Martlets
G: Stacey McCullough, Alberta Pandas
D: Heather Vance,  Toronto Varsity Blues
D: Virginie Bilodeau, Patriotes de UQTR
D: Carol Scheibel, Calgary Dinos
F: Jen Rawson, Toronto Varsity Blues
F: Guylaine Haché, Moncton Anges Bleus
F: Brandy West, Regina Cougars
F: Corinne Swirsky, Concordia Stingers
F: Lisa Backman, Wilfrid Laurier Golden Hawks
F: Danielle Bourgeois, Alberta Pandas

Reference

2001-02 
G: Kim St-Pierre, McGill Martlets
G : Alison Houston,  Toronto Lady Blues
D: Leanne MacDonald, St. Francis Xavier X-Women
D:  Virginie Bilodeau, Patriotes de UQTR
D:  Susie Laska, Lady Blues de Toronto
D:  Joell Fidler, Regina Cougars
F: Brandy West, Regina Cougars
F: Lisa Backman, Wilfrid Laurier Golden Hawks
F: Lisa-Marie Breton, Concordia Stingers
F: Tasha Noble, Saint Mary's Huskies
F: Jen Rawson, Toronto Lady Blues
F: Krysty Lorenz, Alberta Pandas

Reference

2002-03 
G: Cindy Eadie,  Wilfrid Laurier Golden Hawks
G: Stacey McCullough, Alberta Pandas
D: Judy Diduck, Alberta Pandas
D: Suzanne Kaye, Concordia Stingers
D: Alison Goodman, Wilfrid Laurier Golden Hawks
D: Melanie Roach, York Lions
F : Lori Shupak, Alberta Pandas
F: Marie-Claude Allard, Concordia Stingers
F: Kerri-Ann Rudaniecki, Guelph Gryphons
F: Danielle Bourgeois, Alberta Pandas
F: Sophie Acheson, McGill Martlets
F: Tasha Noble, Saint Mary's Huskies

Reference

2003-04 
In 2003, U Sports, then known as Canadian Interuniversity Sport (CIS), added an All-Stars category for the playoffs.

Regular season
G: Kim St-Pierre, McGill Martlets
G: Alison Houston, Toronto Lady Blues
D: Sue Kaye, Concordia Stingers
D: Alison Goodman, Wilfrid Laurier Golden Hawks
D: Judy Diduck, Alberta Pandas
D: Kim Malcher, Toronto Lady Blues
F: Marie-Claude Allard,  Concordia Stingers
F: Danielle Bourgeois, Alberta Pandas
F: Karrie Boyle, Saint Mary’s Huskies
F: Elizabeth Chiasson, Queen’s Golden Gaels
F: Krissy Thompson, Wilfrid Laurier Golden Hawks
F: Lori Shupak, Alberta Pandas

Playoff All-Star selections
G: Alison Houston, Toronto Lady Blues
D: Michelle Koester, Lethbridge Horns
D: Carol Scheibel, Alberta Pandas
D: Susie Laska, Toronto Lady Blues
F: Lori Shupak, Alberta Pandas
F: Danielle Bourgeois, Alberta Pandas

Reference

2004-05 
In 2004, the then-CIS began selecting two All-Star teams (first All-Stars and now second All-Stars) and an All-Rookie Team, as well as maintaining the selection of All-Stars Team for the playoffs tournament.

First All-Stars Team
G: Cecilia Anderson, Concordia Stingers
D: Judy Diduck, Alberta Pandas
D: Alison Goodman, Wilfrid Laurier Golden Hawks
F: Elizabeth Chiasson, Queen's Golden Gaels
F: Danielle Bourgeois, Alberta Pandas
F: Delaney Collins, Alberta Pandas

Second All-Stars Team
G: Lucie Fortin, UBC Thunderbirds
D: Joell Fiddler, Regina Cougars
D: Safiya Muharuma, Toronto Lady Blues
F: Véronique Lapierre,  McGill Martlets
F: Lindsay Taylor, Saint Mary's Huskies
F: Dominique Rancour, Concordia Stingers

All-Rookie Team
G: Cecilia Anderson, Concordia Stingers
D: Katie Barrett, St. Francis Xavier X-Women
F: Rebecca Davies, St. Francis Xavier X-Women

Playoffs All Stars
G: Megan Takeda, Ottawa Gee-Gees
D: Judy Diduck, Alberta Pandas
D: Ashley Stephenson,  Wilfrid Laurier Golden Hawks
F: Véronique Lapierre, McGill Martlets
F: Lindsay Taylor, Saint Mary's Huskies
F: Danielle Bourgeois, Alberta Pandas

Reference

2005-06 
First All-Stars Team
G: Cindy Eadie,  Wilfrid Laurier Golden Hawks
D: Delaney Collins-Pye, Alberta Pandas
D: Roxanne Dupuis, Concordia Stingers
F: Danielle Bourgeois, Alberta Pandas d
F: Élizabeth Chiasson, Queen's Golden Gaels
F: Lindsay Taylor, Saint Mary's Huskies

Second All-Stars Team
G: Cecilia Anderson, Concordia Stingers
D: Ashley Stephenson, Wilfrid Laurier Golden Hawks
D: Jacqueline Stroeve, Lethbridge Horns
F: Kate Allgood, Brock Badgers
F: Dominique Rancour, Concordia Stingers
F: Kimberly Kerr, Ottawa Gee-Gees

All-Rookie Team
G: Catherine Herron, McGill Martlets
D: Sandy Roy, Concordia Stingers
D: Andrea Bevan, Wilfrid Laurier Golden Hawks
F: Tarin Podloski, Alberta Pandas
F:  Elaine Dumas, Guelph Gryphons
F: Courtney Schriver, Saint Mary's Huskies

Reference

Playoff All-Star selections
CIS championship MVP player: Ashley Stephenson, Wilfrid Laurier Golden Hawks
G: Cindy Eadie, Wilfrid Laurier Golden Hawks
D: Ashley Stephenson, Wilfrid Laurier Golden Hawks
D: Delaney Collins-Pye, Alberta Pandas
F: Danielle Bourgeois, Alberta Pandas
F: Laurissa Kenworthy, Wilfrid Laurier Golden Hawks
F: Valérie Paquette, McGill Martlets

Reference

2006-07 
First All-Stars Team
G: Melanie Quinn, York Lions
D: Ashley Stephenson, Wilfrid Laurier Golden Hawks
D: Haleigh Callison, UBC Thunderbirds
F: Courtney Schriver, Saint Mary’s Huskies
F: Kate Allgood, Brock Badgers
F: Kristen Hagg, Alberta Pandas

Second All-Stars Team
G: Emily Hobbs, Saint-Thomas Tommies
D: Kim Devereaux, Toronto Lady Blues
D: Arielle Schade, Regina Cougars
F: Tarin Podloski, Alberta Pandas
F: Kim Kerr, Ottawa Gee-Gees
F: Rebecca Davies, St. Francis Xavier X-Women

All-Rookie Team
G: Terri Ryerson, UBC Thunderbirds
D: Laura Grant, St. Francis Xavier X-Women
F: Karissa Swan,  Regina Cougars

Playoff All-Stars
CIS championship MVP award: Lindsay McAlpine, Alberta Pandas
Sportsmanship Award: Liane Kisil, Manitoba Bisons
G: Holly Tarleton, Alberta Pandas
D: Rayanne Reeve, Alberta Pandas
D: Catherine Ward, McGill Martlets
F: Tarin Podloski, Alberta Pandas
F: Lindsay McAlpine, Alberta Pandas
F: Laurissa Kenworthy, Wilfrid Laurier Golden Hawks

Reference

2007-08 
First All-Star team
G: Charline Labonté, McGill Martlets
D: Andrea Bevan, Wilfrid Laurier Golden Hawks
D: Catherine Ward,  McGill Martlets
F : Lindsay McAlpine, Alberta Pandas
F: Mariève Provost, Moncton Aigles Bleus
F: Vanessa Davidson, McGill Martlets

Second All-Star Team
G: Stephanie Lockert, Toronto Lady Blues
D: Marilynn Hay,  Wilfrid Laurier Golden Hawks
D: Rayanne Reeve, Alberta Pandas
F: Kate Allgood, Brock Badgers
F: Tarin Podloski, Alberta Pandas
F: Christine Hartnoll, McGill Martlets

All-Rookie Team
G: Melinda Choy, UBC Thunderbirds
D: Catherine Ward,  McGill Martlets
F: Mariève Provost, Moncton Aigles Bleus

Reference

Playoff All-Star selections
CIS championship MVP award: Lindsay McAlpine, Alberta Pandas
Sportsmanship Award: Liane Kisil,  Manitoba Bisons
G: Holly Tarleton, Alberta Pandas
D: Rayanne Reeve, Alberta Pandas
D: Catherine Ward, McGill Martlets
F: Tarin Podloski, Alberta Pandas
F: Lindsay McAlpine, Alberta Pandas
F: Laurissa Kenworthy, Wilfrid Laurier Golden Hawks

Reference

2008-09 

First All-Star Team
G: Charline Labonté, McGill Martlets
D: Andrea Bevan, Wilfrid Laurier Golden Hawks
D: Catherine Ward, McGill Martlets
F: Brayden Ferguson, St. Francis Xavier X-Women
F: Jennifer Newton, Alberta Pandas
F: Vanessa Davidson, McGill Martlets

Second All-Star team
G: Stéphanie Lockert, Toronto Lady Blues
D: Marilynn Hay,  St. Francis Xavier X-Women
D: Kerri Palmer, Carleton Ravens
F: Ann-Sophie Bettez, McGill Martlets
F: Janine Davies, Toronto Lady Blues
F: Lauren Barch, Wilfrid Laurier Golden Hawks

All-Rookie Team
G: Kathy Desjardins, Moncton Aigles Bleus
D: Kerri Palmer, Carleton Ravens
D: Andrea Boras, Alberta Pandas
F: Ann-Sophie Bettez, McGill Martlets
F: Addie Miles, Manitoba Bisons
F: Jocelyn LeBlanc, Dalhousie Tigers

Reference

Playoff All-Stars
CIS championship MVP award: Cathy Chartrand,  McGill Martlets
Sportsmanship Award: Suzanne Fenerty,  St. Francis Xavier X-Women
G: Liz Knox, Wilfrid Laurier Golden Hawks
D: Cathy Chartrand, McGill Martlets
D: Catherine Ward, McGill Martlets
F: Vanessa Davidson,  McGill Martlets
F: Andrea Ironside, Wilfrid Laurier Golden Hawks
F: Lauren Meschino, Wilfrid Laurier Golden Hawks

Reference

2009-10 
First All-Star Team
G: Charline Labonté, McGill Martlets
D: Catherine Ward, McGill Martlets
D: Andrea Bevan, Wilfrid Laurier Golden Hawks
F: Tarin Podloski, Alberta Pandas
F: Ann-Sophie Bettez, McGill Martlets
F: Mariève Provost, Moncton Aigles bleus

Second All-Star Team
G: Stacey Corfield, Manitoba Bisons
D: Cathy Chartrand,  McGill Martlets
D: Stephanie Ramsay, Alberta Bisons
F: Vanessa Davidson, McGill Martlets
F: Andrea Ironside, Wilfrid Laurier Golden Hawks
F: Alana Cabana, Alberta Pandas

All-Rookie Team
G: Kendyl Valenta, Toronto Lady Blues
D: Stephanie Ramsay, Alberta Pandas
D: Julia Endicott, Waterloo Warriors
F: Marie-Andrée Leclerc-Auger, McGill Martlets
F: Tamara Bell, Guelph Gryphons
F: Janelle Parent, IPE Panthers

Reference

Playoff All-Star selections
CIS championship MVP award: Catherine Ward, McGill Martlets
Sportsmanship Award:  Suzanne Fenerty, St. Francis Xavier X-Women
G: Charline Labonté, McGill Martlets
D: Cathy Chartrand, McGill Martlets
D: Catherine Ward, McGill Martlets
F: Mariève Provost, Moncton Aigles Bleus
F: Ann-Sophie Bettez, McGill Martlets
F: Andrea Ironside, Wilfrid Laurier Golden Hawks

Reference

2010-11 
First All-Star Team
G: Charline Labonté,  McGill Martlets
D: Cathy Chartrand,  McGill Martlets
D: Suzanne Fenerty, St. Francis Xavier X-Women
F: Hayley Wickenheiser, Calgary Dinos
F: Mariève Provost, Moncton Aigles Bleus
F: Kelly Walker, Brock Badgers

Second All-Star team
G: Beth Clause, Brock Badgers
D: Gillian Ferrari, McGill Martlets
D: Laura Shearer, Dalhousie Tigers
F: Ann-Sophie Bettez, McGill Martlets
F: Alex Normore, St. Francis Xavier X-Women
F: Breanne George, Saskatchewan Huskies

All-Rookie Team
G: Nicole Kesteris,  Toronto Lady Blues
D: Alannah Wakefield,  Wilfrid Laurier Golden Hawks
D: Jenna Pitts, St. Francis Xavier X-Women
F: Alex Normore, St. Francis Xavier X-Women
F: Katia Clément-Heydra, McGill Martlets
F: Laura Brooker, Wilfrid Laurier Golden Hawks

Reference

Playoff All-Star selections
CIS championship MVP award:Jordanna Peroff, McGill Martlets
Sportsmanship : Nicole Pratt, Alberta Pandas
G: Mel Dodd-Moher,  Queen’s Golden Gaels
D: Cathy Chartrand, McGill Martlets
D: Suzanne Fenerty, St. Francis Xavier X-Women
F: Carolyn Campbell, St. Francis Xavier X-Women
F: Jordanna Peroff,  McGill Martlets
F: Leslie Oles, McGill Martlets

Reference

2011-12 
First All-Star Team
G: Charline Labonté,  McGill Martlets
D: Cathy Chartrand,  McGill Martlets
D: Suzanne Fenerty, St. Francis Xavier X-Women
F: Ann-Sophie Bettez, McGill Martlets
F: Alex Normore, St. Francis Xavier X-Women
F: Julie Paetsch, Saskatchewan Huskies

Second All-Star team
G: Rebecca Bouwhuis, Waterloo Warriors
D:  Stephanie Ramsay, Calgary Dinos
D: Jacalyn Sollis, Guelph Gryphons
F: Hayley Wickenheiser, Calgary Dinos
F: Mélodie Daoust, McGill Martlets
F: Jill Morillo UOIT Ridgebacks

All-Rookie Team
G: Rebecca Bouwhuis, Waterloo Warriors
D: Valérie Watson, Ottawa Gee-Gees
D: Kristen Barbara, York Lions
F: Mélodie Daoust, McGill Martlets
F: Marie-Pier Arsenault, Moncton Aigles Bleu
F: Sadie Lenstra, Lethbridge Pronghorns
  
Playoff All-Star selections
CIS championship MVP award: Amanda Tapp, Calgary Dinos
Sportsmanship :  Andrea Boras, Alberta Pandas
G: Amanda Tapp, Calgary Dinos
D: Stephanie Ramsay, Calgary Dinos
D: Élizabeth Mantha, Montréal Carabins
F:  Kim Deschênes, Montréal Carabins
F:  Leslie Oles, McGill Martlets
F:  Hayley Wickenheiser, Calgary Dinos

Reference

Previous Championship tournaments 
 2011 CIS women's ice hockey Championship
 2010 CIS women's ice hockey Championship
 2009 CIS women's ice hockey Championship
 2008 CIS women's ice hockey Championship
 2007 CIS women's ice hockey Championship
 2006 CIS women's ice hockey Championship
 2005 CIS women's ice hockey Championship
 2004 CIS women's ice hockey Championship
 2003 CIS women's ice hockey Championship

References

External links 
 
 U Sports Women's Hockey Championship

Further reading 

  M. Ann Hall, Immodest and Sensational: 150 Years of Canadian Women in Sport, James Lorimer & Company Ltd. Toronto 2008. 
  Michael McKinley, Hockey A People's History, McClelland & Stewart ltd, 2006. 
  Wayne Norton, Women on Ice: The Early Years of Women's Hockey in Western Canada,Ronsdale Press 2009. 
  John Chi-Kit Wong, Coast to Coast: Hockey in Canada to the Second World War, University of Toronto Press 2009. 

 
U Sports ice hockey
2